The Big Valley Jamboree, commonly referred to as "BVJ", is an annual country music festival held in Camrose, Alberta, Canada. Established in 1992, the Jamboree is held during the Civic Holiday in August and features country singers from North America. Performers at BVJ have included Tim McGraw, Gary Allan, Kevin Costner, and Josh Turner in 2009 and Brad Paisley, Lady Antebellum, and Reba McEntire in 2015. The event draws thousands of campers and partygoers annually, with daily averages of 25,000 people attending the four-day event.

Overview
The Big Valley Jamboree adds up to C$10 million to the Camrose economy, and organizers have spent millions of dollars upgrading and maintaining the Camrose Exhibition Grounds for the annual festival.  The Canadian Country Music Association has voted the Big Valley Jamboree as the country music event of the year on four occasions: 2001, 2004, 2006, and 2010.

History
Big Valley Jamboree was launched in 1992 by the owners/operators of the Big Valley Jamboree held in Craven, Saskatchewan (now known as Country Thunder Saskatchewan), who wanted to host a second festival in Alberta; Big Valley, Alberta was chosen as the venue, with the name and geography factoring into the decision. In September 1992, a rock concert headlined by Bryan Adams was held; however, the festival was hampered by an early snowfall and a lack of services and amenities, so the following spring, promoters searched for a new venue. At the same time, organizers of the Camrose Regional Exhibition (CRE) were looking to revive the annual summer fair and were approached by promoters about taking over the annual fair weekend. Ultimately, the CRE board of directors voted to cancel the fair in favour of hosting Big Valley Jamboree, rebranded as a country music festival, to be held during the 1993 August long weekend.

2009 stage collapse

On August 1, 2009, a large storm with winds from  caused the collapse of the main stage, killing one person and injuring at least fifteen others, four critically. Producers of the Jamboree estimated that seventy-five people were treated for injuries. The storm hit while Billy Currington was on stage. Currington and his bass guitarist were injured. Organizers had just postponed the concert and were in the process of clearing spectators from the concert area, when a storm front hit, causing the collapse. Environment Canada had issued a severe thunderstorm warning for the Camrose area earlier; however, the organizers were not advised until just before the storm hit and thus did not alert concertgoers. The final day of the festival was cancelled.

See also
 List of country music festivals
 List of folk festivals
 Festivals in Alberta

References

External links
 

Folk festivals in Canada
Music festivals established in 1992
Music festivals in Alberta
Country music festivals in Canada
Camrose, Alberta